The ISSF World Shooting Championships are governed by the International Shooting Sport Federation. World Shooting Championships began in 1897, after the successful 1896 Summer Olympics, and although the ISSF was not founded until 1907, these early competitions are still seen by the organization as the beginning of a continuous row of championships. By this logic, the 2006 competition in Zagreb was called the 49th ISSF World Shooting Championships. These championships, including all ISSF shooting events, are held every four years since 1954. For the shotgun events only, there is an additional World Championship competition in odd-numbered years. These extra competitions are not numbered. In running target, there will be World Championships in Olympic years.

ISSF World Shooting Championships
The World Championships were held each year from 1897 to 1931, with the exception of the years 1915–1920 (interruption by World War I) and 1926. From 1933 to 1949, they were held biennially, although the 1941–1945 competitions were canceled (again, because of world war). The current schedule, with large World Championships only every four years, was adapted in 1954.

Originally, 300 metre rifle (in various positions) was the only discipline on the programme, despite many other events having been included in the Olympics. In 1900, 50 metre pistol was added. This programme was in use until 1929, the only change being the addition of 300 metre army rifle, with mandatory use of the host nation's army weapon, in 1911. The 1929 championships in Stockholm saw the addition of most of the remaining events from the Olympic programme: 100 metre running deer, 50 metre rifle and trap. 25 metre rapid fire pistol had to wait until 1933.

Immediately after World War II, 300 metre standard rifle (with more strict rules than 300 metre rifle but less than 300 metre army rifle) was added along with 25 metre center-fire pistol and skeet. There was also briefly a combined 50 and 100 m rifle competition. Specific women's events began to be slowly added from 1958, although women had previously, and at times successfully, been allowed to compete alongside the men. The last remaining army rifle event and 100 metre running deer were dropped in 1966, the latter in favour of 50 metre running target. 50 metre standard rifle was also added for both men and women, but was soon dropped for the men due to the similarity to 50 metre rifle. The 1970 World Championships in Phoenix added airgun events, 25 metre standard pistol and the mixed running target competition. 10 metre running target was added in 1981.

For the 1994 competitions in Milan, a number of profound changes were made. First, junior competitions were added (like the senior championships, these are only held every four years); they had previously been tested in the special shotgun and airgun championships. Second, there were no longer medals awarded in single positions in the 300 metre and 50 metre rifle matches (except for the prone position, which has its own match). Third, double trap had been introduced five years earlier in Montecatini Terme and now made its way into the large championships. With only minor additions, the 1994 programme is still in use.

Before World War I (1897 to 1914) and Interwar period (1921 to 1939)

After World War II

Special shotgun and running target championships 
Special shotgun championships were first held in 1934, and since 1959 they are held biennially so that in these events, there are either Olympic Games or World Championships each year. The original event was trap; skeet was added in 1950 and double trap in 1989.

It was in this kind of championship that the first woman won a World Championship medal in shooting: Carola Mandel (USA) in 1950. Women got their own competitions in 1967.

Running target events have been sporadically included; the last time was 1983. As a compensation for the 2005 loss of Olympic status for 10 metre running target however, it has been decided to hold provisional World Championships in 10 metre running target and 50 metre running target in Olympic years, starting in 2008. 

5 Edition (1961, 1967, 1973, 1975, 1983) of shotgun and running target was held simultaneously.

Shotgun 

 shotgun and running target simultaneously

Running target

 shotgun and running target simultaneously

Special airgun championships 
From 1979 to 1991, there were seven special airgun championships, including 10 metre air rifle, 10 metre air pistol and sometimes also 10 metre running target. This kind of championship has been discontinued.

Rifle/Pistol World championships 
In 2022, ISSF organized the first Rifle/Pistol World Championships, separate from the Shotgun and Running target events.

Junior championships 
 2017 ISSF Junior World Championships
 2017 World Target Sprint Championships

Current individual events

300 meter rifle three positions
300 meter rifle prone
300 meter standard rifle
50 meter rifle three positions
50 meter rifle prone
10 meter air rifle
50 meter pistol
25 meter pistol
25 meter standard pistol
25 meter rapid fire pistol
25 meter center-fire pistol
10 meter air pistol
50 meter running target
50 meter running target mixed
10 meter running target
10 meter running target mixed
Trap
Double trap
Skeet

Total medals by country (senior current events only)
This table was calculated for the senior current events only. Last updated after 2009 World Running Target Championships.

Discontinued events

Medals

Nations
This table was calculated for the senior events only, including both current and discontinued events. Last updated after 2019 World Shotgun Championships.

Individual
In this list the multiple medalists only individual of all-time who has won at least 7 gold medal.

Individual and team
In this list the multiple medalists (individual and team) of all-time.

See also
Shooting at the Summer Olympics
ISSF World Cup
ISSF Junior World Cup
European Shooting Championships
Asian Shooting Championships

References

External links
ISSF Results Overview
World Championships archive results (1929-2003) at Sport-komplett.de

 
ISSF shooting competitions
 
Recurring sporting events established in 1897